Nireah Johnson (1986 – July 23, 2003) was an African American trans woman who was murdered in Indianapolis, Indiana along with her friend Brandie Coleman, by Paul Moore, after Moore discovered that Johnson was transgender.

Background
On June 18, 2003, Nireah Johnson, 17, and her friend Brandie Coleman, 18, were riding around with another friend. The trio saw Paul Moore riding in a car driven by Curtis Ward, and asked them to pull into a gas station parking lot. Johnson and Moore got out of their vehicles, talked briefly and exchanged numbers.

Moore reportedly said he was attracted to Johnson, and believed Johnson was a cisgender woman. Moore later told police that Johnson kissed him on the cheek when they parted, and they agreed to meet later. He denied meeting Johnson at a later date.

Murder
According to court documents, at 12:51 a.m. on July 23, Coleman called Moore's home to speak with Ward. Coleman and Johnson then drove to Moore's apartment. The four talked outside and then went into the apartment. Ward and Coleman went into Ward's room, while Moore and Johnson went into Moore's room.

Moore later entered Ward's room with a Ruger P90 handgun and asked to speak with Ward. The two men went into the kitchen, where Moore asked if Ward knew whether Johnson was anatomically male or female. The two men went into the living room, where Moore asked Johnson and Coleman what sex Johnson was assigned at birth.

When Johnson went to use the bathroom, after forty minutes of discussion, Moore followed and discovered Johnson was a trans woman. Moore became upset, and then asked Ward to get some wire. They used the wire to bind Coleman's and Johnson's hands behind their backs. Moore put Johnson and Coleman in the back seat of their vehicle, and told Ward to follow him.

Moore drove to a wooded area in Fall Creek Corridor Park in Indianapolis. Ward made a U-turn after which Moore entered Ward's vehicle and shot Johnson and Coleman to death. Moore then dismantled the handgun and threw the pieces out of the window. The men then returned to Moore's home.

That afternoon, Moore called Ward to suggest they set fire to the vehicle they had left Johnson and Coleman in. Ward  spoke to Moore's half-brother, Clarence McGee, who had seen Johnson's and Coleman's bodies in the vehicle. McGee and Ward returned to the park that night with a can of gasoline and burned the vehicle containing Johnson's and Coleman's bodies.

Discovery
Johnson's and Coleman's bodies were found later, on the night of July 23, when firefighters were alerted to a burning vehicle. They were found lying on the back seat of the Jeep. Their bodies were burned beyond recognition, and investigators were unable to determine the race or sex of either victim. Police treated the deaths as homicides, though they had not yet determined whether the victims had been murdered.

On July 24, the Marion County, Indiana coroner's office released Johnson's and Coleman's names as homicide victims. The coroner's report said that each had been shot in the forehead before the fire started. Investigators determined that gasoline had been poured into the back seat and ignited. Authorities were alerted when Coleman's mother, Mary Coleman recognized the vehicle in news reports, from the FedEx plate on the front. Mary Coleman, who worked at FedEx, called a television station, and the station then contacted the police.

Aftermath

Arrests
Paul Moore was arrested on Thursday, July 31, 2003, after Adrian Beverly identified him as the passenger she had seen in Ward's car on July 18, with Johnson and Coleman. Police were also led to Moore when ballistics tests revealed that the .45 caliber bullets removed from the victims matched a gun taken from Moore during a disturbance in 2002. Moore was charged with murder, confinement, and arson.

Ward was arrested, and charged with confinement, arson, and assisting a criminal. Clarence McGee was arrested as well.

Trial
Moore and McGee went to trial in April 2004. Ward testified against Moore and McGee in exchange for lesser charges. The jury found both men guilty. Moore was convicted on two counts of murder, criminal confinement, and arson. McGee was convicted of arson, assisting a criminal, and obstruction of justice.

On May 5, 2004 judge Robert Altice gave Moore combined sentences of 120 years for the murders of Johnson and Coleman. Moore received consecutive 55 year sentences for the murder of Johnson and Coleman, and concurrent ten-year sentences for each count of confinement and arson.

McGee was sentenced to 10 years in prison for being an accomplice.

Moore's conviction and sentence were upheld on appeal in May 2005.

See also
List of unlawfully killed transgender people

References

External links

2003 murders in the United States
Violence against trans women
Crime in Indianapolis
People murdered in Indiana
Deaths by firearm in Indiana
American victims of anti-LGBT hate crimes
History of women in Indiana
2003 in LGBT history